The Donations of Alexandria (Autumn 34 BC) were a political act by Cleopatra VII and Mark Antony in which they distributed lands held by Rome and Parthia amongst Cleopatra's children and granted them many titles, especially for Caesarion, son of Julius Caesar. These were the second of two such donations; a similar donations ceremony was held two years earlier in Antioch in 36 BC, at which time the donations enjoyed Octavian's full approval of the Antonian strategy to rule the East making use of Cleopatra's unique royal Seleucid lineage in the regions donated. Ultimately, the Donations (of 34 BC) caused a fatal breach in Antony's relations with Rome and were amongst the causes of the Final War of the Roman Republic.

Background
The Donations followed the failure of Antony's military campaign in Parthia. Antony attempted to play up his military success against Armenia and play down the defeat by Parthia by creating a festival imitating a Roman triumph to celebrate his victory over the Armenian leader Artavasdes, who was led in captivity through the city of Alexandria. Antony then held a public banquet in which he dressed as the god Dionysus. The captured Armenian royal family was brought before Cleopatra VII, to whom they were expected to prostrate themselves, but they refused to do so, earning her wrath.

Donations
For the finale of the festivities, the whole city was summoned to the Gymnasium of Alexandria, where Antony and Cleopatra, dressed as Dionysus-Osiris and Isis-Aphrodite, sat on golden thrones. Caesarion was depicted as Horus, son of Isis. The children were similarly in the attire of their new kingdoms. Antony affirmed Cleopatra as queen of Egypt, Cyprus, Libya, and central Syria.

The Donations themselves included:
Alexander Helios was named king of Armenia, Media and Parthia;
his twin Cleopatra Selene II got Cyrenaica and Libya;
the young Ptolemy Philadelphus was awarded Syria, Phoenicia and Cilicia;
Cleopatra was proclaimed Queen of Kings and Queen of Egypt, to rule with Caesarion (Ptolemy XV Caesar, son of Julius Caesar)
Caesarion was proclaimed as the son of the deified Julius Caesar (son of god), King of Kings, and King of Egypt; Caesarion was declared the legitimate heir of Julius Caesar, although Caesar himself had adopted Octavian (later known as Augustus) in his will and left him the majority of his fortune.

Consequences
Antony sent an announcement of the donations to Rome, hoping that the Senate would confirm them, which it refused to do. Octavian's political position was threatened by the acknowledgement of Caesarion as legitimate and heir to Caesar's name. Octavian's base of power was his link with Caesar through adoption, which granted him much-needed popularity and the loyalty of the legions.  Octavian increased the personal attacks against Mark Antony and Cleopatra, and the Second Triumvirate expired on the last day of 33 BC, not to be renewed. Thus began the last war of the Roman Republic, with Octavian's victory resulting in the transition to the Imperial Era.

See also
Alexandrian Kings 
Ptolemaic dynasty
Battle of Actium

References

External links
 Cassius Dio, Roman History, Book 49
  Plutarch, Life of Antony, Chapter 54

34 BC
Cleopatra
Ptolemaic Alexandria
Foreign relations of ancient Rome
Caesarion